Tapio Säynevirta (1 March 1965 – 5 September 2012) was a Finnish sports shooter. He competed in the men's 10 metre air rifle event at the 1988 Summer Olympics.

References

External links
 

1965 births
2012 deaths
Finnish male sport shooters
Olympic shooters of Finland
Shooters at the 1988 Summer Olympics
People from Leppävirta
Sportspeople from North Savo